Camden was built at Whitby in 1813. She served as a general trader for much of her career, though in 1820-21 she made one voyage to Bombay for the British East India Company (EIC). Between 1833 and 1837 she was a Greenland whaler out of the Whitby whale fishery, and was the last vessel from Whitby to engage in whaling. She was last listed in Lloyd's Register in 1850.

Career
Camden first appeared in the registers in the Register of shipping (RS) in 1814.<ref>[https://hdl.handle.net/2027/mdp.39015024214440?urlappend=%3Bseq=157 '"RS (1814), "C" supple. pages.]</ref>

As a government transport, Camden made a voyage to Jamaica. She returned and then, no longer a transport, sailed to Quebec, returning to England on 16 September 1817.

In 1813 the EIC had lost its monopoly on the trade between India and Britain. British ships were then free to sail to India or the Indian Ocean under a licence from the EIC. Camden, Johnson, master, sailed for Batavia on 25 February 1818, or 27 March. Camden and a number of other outward bound vessels had ended up waiting at Deal. She sailed to Portsmouth, but after leaving Portsmouth had to put back. She finally sailed from Portsmouth on 31 March, bound for Batavia.

On 15 April 1819 Camden, Johnson, master, was at Mauritius, having come from Batavia and Manila. On 2 October she sailed from Gravesend, for Amsterdam. 

EIC voyage (1820-1821)
Captain James Johnson sailed from the Downs on 2 May 1820, bound for Bombay. Camden arrived at Bombay on 21 August. Homeward bound, she was at the Cape of Good Hope on 24 January 1821, and arrived at Gravesend on 7 April.

In 1824 Camden moved her registry to London.

Hudson's Bay Company
Between 1824 and 1831, Camden sailed under charter to the Hudson's Bay Company.

Whaler
Between 1833 and 1837 the Chapmans employed Camden as a whaler in the Whitby whale fishery. Whalers from Whitby had been whaling in Davis Strait since 1753, though by the 1830s the business had almost died out. In 1832 Phoenix, a Chapman-owned ship, was the sole vessel to go out, and she returned with 234 tons of oil (195 Imperial measure), the largest amount ever to have been brought back. The Chapmans therefore sent out Camden in 1833, as well as Phoenix. Both vessels were successful in volume terms: Phoenix  returned with 227 tons, and Camden returned with 230 tons. However, whaling became unprofitable as the price of whale oil had fallen. Between 1833 and 1837 it varied between £23 and over £50 per ton. Whalebone prices varied between £30 and £150 per ton. Phoenix and Camden left in 1837, but Phoenix grounded on her way out and came back to port. Camdens voyage proved a failure. The Chapmans withdrew both ships from whaling, and with that whaling from Whitby ended.

On 31 October 1835 Camden, Armstrong, master, from Davis Strait, and Smales, Sinclair, master, from Quebec, ran afoul of each other. Both received considerable damage.

On 28 March 1838  Camden sailed to America.

On at least one of her voyages, in 1845, Camden brought back lumber for the naval dockyard at Chatham.

FateCamden last appeared in Lloyd's Register'' in 1850. Her owner was still Chapman, but she had no master and no trade. The last mention in ship arrival and departure data was in October 1845 when she sailed for Quebec.

Notes, citations, and references
Notes

Citations

References
 
 
  
 

1813 ships
Ships built in Whitby
Age of Sail merchant ships
Merchant ships of the United Kingdom
Ships of the British East India Company
Hudson's Bay Company ships
Whaling ships